Patrick Leagas is a British musician. Leagas was a founding member of Death In June. After leaving Death In June in 1985 during a tour in Italy, Leagas formed Sixth Comm in 1986 and began working under the name Patrick O-Kill. Sixth Comm frequently collaborated with the Dutch neopagan Freya Aswynn and expressed neopagan themes. Leagas later met vocalist Amodali at a Liverpool club in 1989. The two collaborated extensively in the 1990s as Mother Destruction, which released five albums with pagan themes and influences from electronic dance music. After this, Leagas left music for a period of time when he focused on family life and lived abroad. He returned to music with a double album with Sixth Comm in 2006.

References

Living people
Year of birth missing (living people)
Death in June members
British modern pagans
Performers of modern pagan music